Leslie Martin (1908–1999) was an English architect.

Leslie, Lesley or Les Martin may also refer to:

Leslie H. Martin (1900–1983), Australian physicist and professor
Leslie Dale Martin (1967–2002), American criminal
Lesley Martin, New Zealand pro-euthanasia activist